Thieves Like Us may refer to:

Thieves Like Us (novel), a 1937 novel by Edward Anderson
Thieves Like Us (film), a 1974 film directed by Robert Altman
"Thieves Like Us" (song), a 1984 song by New Order
Thieves Like Us (TV series), a 2007 British sitcom
Thieves Like Us (band), a New York and Sweden based electronica music group
Thieves Like Us, episode 65 and series finale of Police Academy: The Animated Series